Bekecs is a village in Borsod-Abaúj-Zemplén County, Hungary.

In the 19th and 20th centuries, a small Jewish community lived in the village, in 1880 109 Jews lived in the village, most of whom were murdered in the Holocaust. The community had a Jewish cemetery.

References

External links 
 Street map 

Populated places in Borsod-Abaúj-Zemplén County
Jewish communities destroyed in the Holocaust